Gallur (population 2,899) is a small town and municipality in the Spanish Autonomical Region of Aragón, province of Zaragoza.
The town of Gallur is located on a plain which stretches from the West Bank until the Moncayo High River Ebro, in the so-called Somontano Moncayo, seated on the right bank.

References

Municipalities in the Province of Zaragoza